Beijing Jiaotong University (Chinese: 北京交通大学), formerly Northern Jiaotong University, is one of the oldest public universities in mainland China. The main campus is located in the Haidian District in central Beijing. Its coordinates are 116.348 degrees east and 39.959 degrees north. The university's name is often abbreviated by locals to BeiJiaoDa (北交大). JiaoDa is a participant in the Ministry of Education's Project 211, classifying it as a top Chinese university. It is a Chinese state Double First Class University Plan university identified by the Ministry of Education. 

Beijing Jiaotong University is a prominent research university in the field of Transportation Science and Technology. 

In the 2018 Shanghai subject ranking for Transportation Science and Technology, BJTU achieved first place (Beijing Jiaotong University - 1st, Tsinghua University - 2nd, TU Delft - 3rd).

History 

The university was a component of Jiaotong University (also named Chiao Tung University). In September 1909 the Postal Department of the Qing government founded the Railway Management Institute in Beijing. In 1920 the Republic of China was founded and BJTU was attached to the Ministry of Transportation and Communications with its name changed to "Ministry of Communications Traffic Training Institute". Meanwhile, it increased some subjects including the electrical engineering, cable broadcast and radio. In 1921 it merged with two technical schools in Shanghai and Tangshan to form the Jiaotong University.  There were three campuses in Beijing, Shanghai and Tangshan. The Beijing campus was named National Jiaotong University, Beijing (中国交通大学) in 1949. In 1950 the Beijing campus was renamed Northern Jiaotong University (Chinese: 北方交通大学). In September 2003 it was renamed Beijing Jiaotong University (Chinese: 北京交通大学) to make its locality explicit. The Shanghai campus has since separated into two universities which are now Shanghai Jiaotong University(上海交通大学) and Xi'an Jiaotong University(西安交通大学). There are five Jiaotong Universities in China named: Shanghai Jiaotong University, Xi'an Jiaotong University, Beijing Jiaotong University, Southwest Jiaotong University and National Chiao Tung University.
Beijing Jiaotong University is listed in Double First Class University Plan, former 211 Project universities and 985 Project Innovation Platform. In 2017, Beijing Jiaotong University enters the ranks of double first-class construction.

Schools and faculties 
As of 2009, Beijing Jiaotong University has the following under its administration:
 Electronic Information Engineering Institute
 Computer and Informational Technology Institute
 Economy Management Institute
 Communication and Transportation Institute
 Civil Engineering and Architecture Institute
 Mechanical and Electronic Control Engineering Institute
 Electric Power Institute
 Physical Sciences Institute
 Humanities and Social Sciences Institute
 Languages and communication studies Institute
 Long-Distance and Continued Education Institute
 Software Engineering Institute
 Architecture and Art Institute

The university has 22 research institutes and 39 laboratories which include the transportation system simulation laboratory and transportation automation laboratory.

The university library has over a million books, 3000 Chinese and foreign journals, numerous documents on microfiche and audio and video documents on various modern media.

Beijing Jiaotong's facilities include its own transmitter tower, hospital, hotels, TV station, indoor and outdoor swimming pool, gym, arboretum, moot courts, lip balm monkeys, museum, art gallery, railway line and stadium.

As of 2017, there are 25,569 full-time students on the campus. There are 7,527 graduate students working on master's or PhD programs, 500 international students and 8,767 engaged in correspondence programs, night schools and other full-time programs.

There are 2844 faculty members and scientists at the university, 10 of which are academicians of the Chinese Academy of Sciences and Chinese Academy of Engineering, 286 full professors and 588 associate professors. The Transportation, Engineering, Law and ICT faculties are particularly well-regarded.

School id

School badge
Outer ring circle and gear circle are concentric circles in calibration
The school name is Mao Zedong font "Beifang Jiaotong University" 
English use balc font "BEIJING JIAOTONG UNIVERSITY"
"1896"representative school founding time
The round anvil, hammer, chain and gear symbolize industrial manufacturing and products; books symbolize science and knowledge; gear symbolize management, reflecting that the school is a university with science and engineering as its main part.

School motto

Beijing jiaotong university students' time :“知行”

National jiaotong university time:"知行”

Undergraduate programs 

Note:  1. The table is made with reference to “The Catalog of Undergraduate Programs of Regular Higher Education Institutions of China, 2012”.  2. Length of Schooling: Urban and Rural Planning-5 years; Architecture-5 years; Others-4 years.  3. The programs marked with * are accredited by Washington Accord.

International students

The university is a member of the Beijing University of Science and Technology Alliance. According to the university website, in July 2018 the university established cooperative relations with 235 universities and famous multinational enterprises in 45 countries including the United States, Britain, Germany and France. Confucius Institutes have been established in Belgium, United States and Brazil to spread Chinese culture throughout the world. In 2017 the school officially joined the international railway cooperation organization (OSJD) which enhanced the school's influence and voice in the international railway field. Joining the China-CEEC Association of Colleges and Universities has laid a solid foundation for the university to expand its cooperation and exchanges with central and eastern European countries. BJTU hosted the Belt and Road Initiative rail transit training school and the annual meeting of the China-ASEAN rail transit training alliance. The university signed a cooperation agreement with Russia  and Zhan Tianyou College. China and Indonesia signed a cooperation agreement on jointly building a China-Indonesia high-speed railway research center with the Bandung Institute of Technology in Indonesia. Beijing Jiaotong University is one of the first universities authorized by the Chinese government to accept foreign students. BJTU enrolled over 3,000 foreign students and visiting scholars from as many as 71 countries in Asia, Africa, Europe and North America. Jiaotong has agreements with universities in the United States, France, United Kingdom, Germany, Switzerland, Singapore, Japan, Australia. Former U.S. President Barack Obama visited JiaoDa during a state visit to Beijing.

"Entering China" project
"Entering China" is an international exchange program sponsored by Beijing Jiaotong University and the China Women and Children Development Center.

The project promotes international education, cultural exchange and cooperation between Chinese and foreign students. The program is jointly organized by Beijing Jiaotong University and the China Women and Children Development Center in order to provide comprehensive education services for international students.

In 2007 Beijing Jiaotong University appointed Studypath as a strategic technology partner to co-ordinate student enrollment in the project. The online service is a 'technological study-path' available worldwide that supports the exchange program both before and after the students arrive in China. Beijing Jiaoda cooperates with Shanghai Jiaotong University allowing business and economics students to use both campuses.

Notable alumni

Cheng Kejie, former Vice Chairman of the Standing Committee of the National People's Congress.
Liang Tsai-Ping, guzheng player
Mao Yisheng, structural engineer, an expert on bridge construction, and a social activist.
Zheng Zhenduo, a Chinese journalist, writer, archaeologist, and scholar
Liu Han, founder of China's first radio station, "Father of China Broadcasting"

References

External links
 Official website
 Official website 
 Official website of Studypath
 Official jwc website

 
Webarchive template wayback links
1896 establishments in China
Educational institutions established in 1896
Jiaotong University
Universities and colleges in Haidian District